The Uganda People's Democratic Army (UPDA) was a rebel group operating in northern Uganda from March 1986 to June 1988.

In January 1986, the government of Ugandan President Tito Okello was overthrown by the rebel National Resistance Army (NRA) under the command of Yoweri Museveni, which took the capital city of Kampala. By March 1986, NRA forces had occupied the traditional land of the Acholis, from which President Okello came.  In the same month, former government Uganda National Liberation Army soldiers from Acholiland who had sought sanctuary in southern Sudan formed the rebel Uganda People's Democratic Army to force the NRA out of the North and regain the Acholi's previous status.  

By late 1986, the UPDA had proved unable to retake towns, though it controlled much of the countryside, and was clearly losing. Many rebels deserted, and smaller units spun off into semi-banditry. Many Acholi refused to accept the logical conclusion that resistance was futile and began to support the Holy Spirit Movement of Alice Auma, which promised a millenarian vision of earthly paradise or similar chiliastic groups that had sprung up, including the rebel group led by Joseph Kony that would become the Lord's Resistance Army (LRA).  

After a year of increasingly desperate operations, including fierce battles among the various Acholi rebel groups for resources, the UPDA signed an accord with the government on 3 June 1988 that called for an end to the conflict and a democratic government. The negotiations were exceptional in that they were carried out by military officers of the UPDA and the NRA. The political wing of the UPDA and the National Resistance Movement were excluded from the talks. While the UPDA founder Odong Latek refused to accept the accord and joined the LRA, most of his officers realized that their military situation was hopeless and, by early 1989, the UPDA had ceased to exist.

Guerrilla organizations
Rebel groups in Uganda
Ugandan nationalism